In Indian literature, Kāmashastra refers to the tradition of works on Kāma: Desire (love, erotic, sensual and sexual desire in this case). It therefore has a practical orientation, similar to that of Arthashastra, the tradition of texts on politics and government. Just as the latter instructs kings and ministers about government, Kāmashastra aims to instruct the townsman (nāgarika) in the way to attain enjoyment and fulfillment.

Etymology 
Kaama is a Sanskrit word that has the general meanings of "wish", "desire", and "intention" in addition to the specific meanings of "pleasure" and "(sexual) love". Used as a proper name it refers to Kamadeva, the Hindu god of  Love.

History 
During the 8th century BC, Shvetaketu, son of Uddalaka, produced a work too vast to be accessible. A scholar called Babhravya, together with his group of disciples, produced a summary of Shvetaketu's summary, which nonetheless remained a huge and encyclopaedic tome. Between the 3rd and 1st centuries BC, several authors reproduced different parts of the Babhravya group's work in various specialist treatises. Among the authors, those whose names are known are Charayana, Ghotakamukha, Gonardiya, Gonikaputra, Suvarnanabha, and Dattaka.

However, the oldest available text on this subject is the Kama Sutra ascribed to Vātsyāyana who is often erroneously called "Mallanaga Vātsyāyana". Yashodhara, in his commentary on the Kama Sutra, attributes the origin of erotic science to Mallanaga, the "prophet of the Asuras", implying that the Kama Sutra originated in prehistoric times. The attribution of the name "Mallanaga" to Vātsyāyana is due to the confusion of his role as editor of the Kama Sutra with the role of the mythical creator of erotic science. Vātsyāyana's birth date is not accurately known, but he must have lived earlier than the 7th century since he is referred to by Subandhu in his poem Vāsavadattā. On the other hand, Vātsyāyana must have been familiar with the Arthashastra of Kautilya. Vātsyāyana refers to and quotes a number of texts on this subject, which unfortunately have been lost.

Following Vātsyāyana, a number of authors wrote on Kāmashastra, some writing independent manuals of erotics, while others commented on Vātsyāyana. Later well-known works include Kokkaka's Ratirahasya (13th century) and Anangaranga of Kalyanamalla (16th century). The most well-known commentator on Vātsyāyana is Jayamangala (13th century).

List of Kamashastra works

Lost works 

 Kâmashâstra of Nandi or Nandikeshvara. (1000)
 Vâtsyâyanasûtrasara, by the Kashmiri Kshemendra:  eleventh-century commentary on the Kama Sutra

Chapters 
 Kâmashâstra, by Auddalaki Shvetaketu (500 chapters)
 Kâmashâstra or Bâbhravyakârikâ
 Kâmashâstra, by Chârâyana

 Kâmashâstra, by Gonikâputra
 Kâmashâstra, by Dattaka (according to legend, the author was transformed to a woman during a certain time)
 Kâmashâstra or Ratinirnaya, by Suvarnanâb
Kama Sutra, by Vatsayana
 Jayamangala or Jayamangla, by Yashodhara:  important commentary on the Kama Sutra
 Jaya, by Devadatta Shâstrî:  a twentieth-century Hindi commentary on the Kama Sutra
 Sûtravritti, by Naringha Shastri:  eighteenth-century commentary on the Kama Sutra

Medieval and modern texts

Texts upto 10th century CE
 Kuchopanisad, by Kuchumara (tenth century)
 Kuttanimata, by the eighth-century Kashmiri poet Damodaragupta (Dāmodaragupta's Kuṭṭanīmata, though often included in lists of this sort, is really a novel written in Sanskrit verse, in which an aged bawd [kuṭṭanī] named Vikarālā gives advice to a young, beautiful, but as yet unsuccessful courtesan of Benares; most of the advice comes in the form of two long moral tales, one about a heartless and therefore successful courtesan, Mañjarī, and the other about a tender-hearted and therefore foolish girl, Hāralatā, who makes the mistake of falling in love with a client and eventually dies of a broken heart.)
 Mânasollâsa or Abhilashitartha Chintâmani by King Someshvara or Somadeva III of the Châlukya dynasty by Kalyâni A part of this encyclopedia, the Yoshidupabhoga, is devoted to the Kamashastra. (Manasolasa or Abhilashitachintamani)

Texts post 11th century CE

 Anangaranga, by Kalyanmalla; 15th-16th century text.
 Kâmasamuha, by Ananta (fifteenth century)
 Nagarasarvasva or Nagarsarvasva, by Bhikshu Padmashrî, a tenth- or eleventh-century Buddhist.
 Panchashâyaka, Panchasakya, or Panchsayaka, by Jyotirîshvara Kavishekhara (fourteenth century)
 Ratirahasya, by Kokkoka; 11th-12th century CE text.
 Janavashya by Kallarasa:  based on Kakkoka's Ratirahasya
 Ratiratnapradîpika, by Praudha Devarâja, fifteenth-century Maharaja of Vijayanagara
 Samayamatrka, a satire by 11th century Kashmiri poet Ksemendra.

Others
 Dattakasûtra, by King Mâdhava II of the Ganga dynasty of Mysore
 Kandarpacudamani
 Kuchopanishad or Kuchumâra Tantra, by Kuchumâra
 Rasamanjari or Rasmanjari, by the poet Bhânudatta
 Ratikallolini, by Dikshita Samaraja
 Smaradîpika, by Minanatha.
Ratimanjari, by the poet Jayadeva:  a synthesis of the Smaradîpika by Minanatha
 Shrngaradipika, by Harihar.
 Shringararasaprabandhadîpika, by Kumara Harihara
 Smarapradîpika or Smara Pradipa, by Gunâkara (son of  Vachaspati)

Kamashastra and Kāvya poetry 
One of the reasons for interest in these ancient manuals is their intimate connection with Sanskrit ornate poetry (Kāvya). The poets were supposed to be proficient in the Kamashastra. The entire approach to love and sex in Kāvya poetry is governed by the Kamashastra.

References 

The Complete Kama Sutra, Translated by Daniélou, Alain. 

 
Hindu tantra
Sanskrit literature
Hindu texts